The Stockholm Programme is a five-year plan with guidelines for justice and home affairs of the member states of the European Union for the years 2010 through 2014.

Contents 
The programme contains guidelines for a common politics on the topics of protection of fundamental rights, privacy, minority rights and rights of groups of people in need of special protection, as well as a citizenship of the European Union.
In the programme there are also plans for a new European security architecture through the extension of cooperation in the areas of police, military and secret services and measures in the area of border-crossing data exchange between state authorities and surveillance of the internet.

It touches areas as different as homeland and public security, migration (European pact on immigration and asylum), the combat against organized crime, and even family law, private law, inheritance law and others.

There is supposed to be expansion of Europol and Eurojust, the establishing of interoperability of police databases, a centralised resident register, improved satellite surveillance, joined deportation planes and flights, new refugee camps outside the EU territory, usage of the military against immigration, police intervention outside of EU territory, expansion of the European Gendarmerie Force and intensified cooperation of secret services, etc..

The Stockholm Programme also includes support for the ongoing Prague Process, stating that the memory of totalitarian crimes "must be a collective memory, shared and promoted, where possible, by us all," and emphasizing that "the Union is an area of shared values, values which are incompatible with crimes against humanity, genocide and war crimes, including crimes committed by totalitarian regimes."

History 
After the Tampere Programme of 1999 and the Hague Programme of 2004, the Stockholm Programme is the third programme of its kind for the states of the European Union.
It has been prepared by the Swedish Presidency of the Council of the European Union on its informal meeting on July 15 through 17 of 2009 and was named after the place of its publication (Stockholm, the capital of Sweden). After decisions-making by the ministers of the interior and the ministers for justice on the first of December it was presented to the European Council on 10th and 11th that month for the final referendum on its summit in Brussels.

Literature 
 The Stockholm Programme: An open and secure Europe serving the citizen, Draft, 16th Oktober 2009 (PDF file, 765 KB). OpenDocument Text, (ODF file; 93 KB).
 European Civil Liberties Network: Statement by the European Civil Liberties Network* on the new EU five-year plan on Justice and Home Affairs. April 2009. (PDF file, 44 KB)
 Federal Trust: More than Just a five-year itch?.
 Centre for European Reform: Seven sins of Stockholm.
 German Institute for International and Security Affairs: Reprogramming EU home affairs.
Say No to Stockholm: noblogs.org

References

Policies of the European Union
Prague Declaration on European Conscience and Communism